Steve Thull is a Luxembourg Army general who is currently serving as Luxembourg's Chief of Defence, the professional head of the country's military. He assumes the role of Chief of Staff of the Army and is authorized to bear the title of general.

Career 
Thull succeeded General Alain Duschène as Chief of Defence on 29 September 2020. He was trained as an officer candidate at the Royal Military Academy in Brussels from 1987 to 1991. After completion of training he joined as lieutenant at Luxembourg Army on 1 October 1991. Later, he participated in NATO's Operation IFOR in Bosnia and Herzegovina in 1997 and Operation EUFOR in Chad and the Central African Republic in 2008. During his army life, he served as Personnel officer and Deputy Commander at the Military Center. He also served as a mortar platoon leader, anti-tank platoon leader and scout platoon leader in his early armed forces career. On 29 September 2020 he became Chief of Defence and was promoted to General.

References 

Living people
1967 births
Luxembourgian soldiers
People from Esch-sur-Alzette
Chiefs of defence